Chonqeraluy-e Yekan (also Romanized as Chonqerālūy-e Yekān; also known as Chonqerālū-ye Yekān, Chownqorālū-ye Yekān, and Chūnqorālūy-e Yekān) is a village in Nazluy-ye Jonubi Rural District of the Central District of Urmia County, West Azerbaijan province, Iran. At the 2006 National Census, its population was 1,403 in 428 households. The following census in 2011 counted 1,348 people in 441 households. The latest census in 2016 showed a population of 1,191 people in 428 households; it was the largest village in its rural district.

References 

Urmia County

Populated places in West Azerbaijan Province

Populated places in Urmia County